This is a list of places on the Victorian Heritage Register in the Shire of Baw Baw in Victoria, Australia. The Victorian Heritage Register is maintained by the Heritage Council of Victoria.

The Victorian Heritage Register, as of 2021, lists the following sixteen state-registered places within the Shire of Baw Baw:

References 

Baw Baw
+